The Twiddler is an input device allowing one to type with a single hand.

History 
The first Twiddler device was launched in 1992 by the HandyKey Corporation. Handkey was purchased in 2007 by the Canadian firm TekGear.

Specification 
The original Twiddler uses a serial port for communication and a PC AT keyboard port for power. This was replaced with USB for the Twiddler 2. The third generation Twiddler communicates using USB or Bluetooth through an optionally installed module.

References

Computer keyboard models
Computer-related introductions in 1992